= Old Bull Lee =

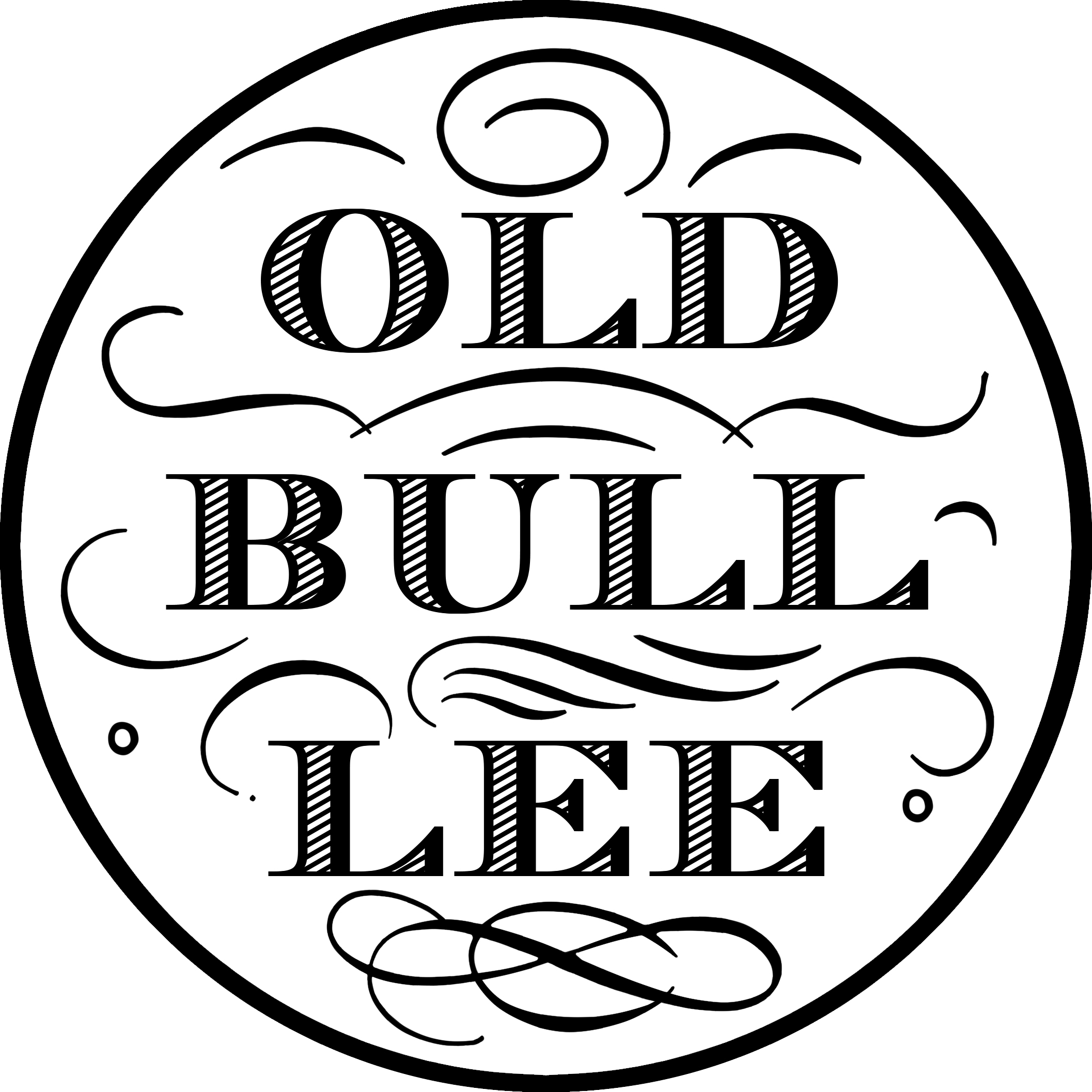
- Company type: Private
- Industry: Apparels
- Founded: 2011; 14 years ago in Manhattan Beach, California, U.S.
- Founder: Lee W. Johnson
- Headquarters: Manhattan Beach, California, U.S.
- Number of locations: 41 stores as of July 2017
- Area served: United States, Japan, South Korea
- Parent: Mockingbird Industries Inc.
- Website: www.oldbullshorts.com

Old Bull Lee, a subsidiary of Mockingbird Industries Inc., is a United States-based retail and online clothing brand rooted in the culture and lifestyle of California and of the East Coast of United States. The company sells men's shorts, shirts and boardshorts of domestic and imported fabrics. As of July 2017, the company operates online and in select boutiques in North America and Asia. Old Bull Lee is headquartered in Manhattan Beach, California.

== History ==
Lee W. Johnson studied architecture at the Southern California Institute of Architecture (SCI-Arc) graduating in the mid-1990s. He left architecture during 2008, and in 2012, he founded the brand Old Bull Lee, a men's clothing operation. To make his shorts, Johnson meet with Italian and French textile manufacturers who introduced him to "stress free" fabric. The shorts are made of cotton-linen blends, plain weaves and twills. Prints are a trademark of many of the Old Bull Lee products.

Johnson named his new clothing company Old Bull Lee, a literary reference from Jack Kerouac's book On the Road, which featured a character called Bull Lee who was modeled after author William S. Burroughs.

In 2017, after a few years producing and selling shorts and button-down shirts, Old Bull Lee expanded their line to include a boardshort category. Lee chose to manufacture in Orange County, California, because of its notability for surfer culture.
